Jean-Julien Rojer and Horia Tecău were the defending champions, but chose not to participate this year.
Rameez Junaid and Adil Shamasdin won the title, defeating Rohan Bopanna and Florin Mergea in the final, 3–6, 6–2, [10–7].

Seeds

Draw

Draw

References
Main Draw

Grand Prix Hassan II - Doubles
2015 Grand Prix Hassan II